Marcus Michael Douglas Behmer (1 October 1879 – 12 September 1958), also known by the pseudonyms Marcotino and Maurice Besnaux, was a German illustrator, graphic designer and painter. He was the first well-known German artist to publicly admit to homosexuality.

Biography
Behmer was born in Weimar, son of the painter Hermann Behmer and grandson of Friedrich Behmer, Oberamtmann of Merzien (now part of Köthen in Saxony-Anhalt) and his wife Elise, youngest daughter of the poet Philippine Engelhard. His father's twin brother Rudolf Behmer (1831–1902) was known as a breeder of Merino sheep; their sister Louise was married to Heinrich von Nathusius (1824–1890). Marcus' brother Joachim Behmer was also an artist. Behmer, in a letter, dates his artistic beginnings to about 1896.

On 1 October 1903, Behmer joined the army. He was made a corporal on 10 June 1904 and promoted on 22 September 1907 to sergeant. From 1914 he served in World War I in Flanders and in Poland. In the summer of 1917 he fell seriously ill "after an operation in the field" and spent six weeks in the field hospital at Jarny in north-eastern France. During his time in the army, he produced many so-called "comrades' portraits" , usually finely crafted miniature profile views of young soldiers. 

In 1898 Behmer made the acquaintance of Karl Walser, also an admirer of Aubrey Beardsley, with whom he remained friends for the rest of his life. He launched his career as a professional artist in 1900 and over the next three years contributed 66 drawings to the monthly magazine Die Insel (The Island ) for Insel Verlag, the satirical weekly Simplicissimus, and other Munich publications. From 1902 on Behmer created book illustrations, designed initials and texts and was responsible for carefully planned book productions, with the Cranach Press of Harry Graf Kessler and others. With Insel Verlag he had his first major success with his illustrations for Wilde's Salome in 1903. Behmer's early works show the strong influence of the illustrative art of Aubrey Beardsley, which later allowed some negative assessments of his work as imitative, though he soon developed his own artistic language parallel to the rise of Expressionism and the new currents of the Wiener Werkstätte. He also designed an internationally recognised work, the series of illustrations for Philipp Otto Runge's Von dem Fischer un syner Fru ("The Fisherman and His Wife"). 

Behmer also worked for other publishers, for example the Paul Cassirer Verlag, which produced  one of his major works, a series of 40 etchings created in 1912 for an edition of Voltaire's Zadig. Like many artists of the Buchkunstbewegung, Behmer ran into financial difficulties in the 1920s, but he remained committed to what he called the "small format" instead of striving for a gallery-based artistic career as did others such as Alfred Kubin, to whom Behmer compared himself in later years.

In created his own antiqua-style typeface in the 1920's and cast it in cast in the Klingspor foundry, a building that has since become a museum and houses a large collection of Behmer's work.

Behmer was close friends with, among others, the family of the writer Ernst Hardt, with the painter Alexander Olbricht and also with the sculptor and painter Dorothea Werner (born Leiding) and her husband.

From 1903 he was a member in Berlin of the WhK, the first homosexual movement in the world. Behmer was arrested in December 1936 and convicted on charges of homosexuality by a court in Konstanz. He was sentenced to two years in prison and served 19 months in prisons in Stockach, Konstanz and Freiburg im Breisgau, emerging in July 1938. In his prison diaries he accepted his punishment, rejecting the idea that God would punish him as the law had for sexual behavior but accepting it as divine punishment for his sins of pride and self-satisfaction. He wrote: 

At times he was given the opportunity to work as an artist in prison. The works produced in this period are mostly calligraphically designed panels of Greek text (prayers and Bible quotations), as well as drawings full of bitterness and irony.

From 1943 Behmer lived at the family home of Donata Helmrich, the daughter of Ernst Hardt, in Berlin-Charlottenburg. He lost almost all of his possessions, including hundreds of drawings, graphics and printing plates, when the Westend neighborhood of Berlin was bombed in November 1944.  He then went to live at Groẞ Nuhnen, the country estate of the Werner family near Frankfurt an der Oder. The rest of his life was spent in poverty in West Berlin, where Dorothea Werner took care of him in 1958 until his death.

Behmer died in Berlin three weeks before his 79th birthday, on 12 September 1958. He was buried in the Heerstraße Cemetery in  the present district of Berlin-Westend.

The Senate of Berlin ordered in 1965 that Behmer's grave (plot 8-C-54) should be dedicated as an Ehrengrab ("grave of honour") of the Land Berlin. The original dedication expired in 2011; the Senate renewed it in 2018 for the usual time period of 20 years.

Renowned museums and collections such as the graphics collection of the Städel Museum in Frankfurt, the Klingspor Museum for calligraphy and typography in Offenbach and the Sternweiler collection in Berlin today house works by Behmer. A critical appraisal of his work is only now being undertaken and his art-historical importance realized.

Selected works

Graphics
Numerous bookplates, usually etched
Various invitations and programme cards
Numerous New Year's wishes sent to friends, mostly etchings, with both metaphorical and political motifs (including between 1931 and 1934 critical comments on the seizure of power by the National Socialists).
Numerous erotic works, often etchings, with explicit and imaginative gay symbolism.
Ten silhouettes by Marcus Behmer. A New Year's gift for the Friends of the Kunstbibliothek, produced by W. Büxenstein. Berlin 1930.
Ten-Mark banknote (using a silhouette) for the state printer, 1919.

Book illustrations
Annemarie von Nathusius: Freie Worte. Eckstein, Berlin, 1902
Oscar Wilde: Salome. Insel Verlag, Leipzig, 1903
Honoré de Balzac: Das Mädchen mit den Goldaugen. German translation by Ernst Hardt. Insel Verlag, Leipzig, 1904
Herman Bang: Excentrische Novellen. Illustrations and title pages by Behmer. Berlin, S. Fischer, 1905.
Ernst Hardt: Ninon von Lenclos. Drama in one act. Insel Verlag, Leipzig, 1905
Ernst Hardt: Tantris der Narr. Drama in 5 acts. Breitkopf & Härtel for Insel Verlag, Leipzig, 1907; book design as well.
Voltaire: Zadig. IX. Work of the Pan Press, published by Paul Cassirer, Berlin, 1912
Brothers Grimm: Sechs Märchen. Brandus, Berlin, 1918
Ecclesiastes oder der Prediger Salomo. Holten, Berlin, 1920
Von dem Fischer un syner Fru. Insel Verlag, Leipzig, 1920 (Insel-Bücherei Nr. 315), also handset by Behmer
Euphorion Verlag: Verlagsbericht über das Gründungsjahr.  With a title etching by Marcus Behmer and an original lithograph by Hermann Struck. Berlin 1920
Der Prophet Jona nach Luther. Insel Verlag, Leipzig, 1920–30, reprinted 1983: Insel-Bücherei Nr 1018/2
Johannes Secundus (J.N. Everaerts): Basia. Officina Serpentis, Berlin, 1921
Oscar Wilde: Die heilige Buhlerin. Berlin, Tillgner, 1921
Enno Littmann: Vom morgenländischen Floh. Dichtung und Wahrheit über den Floh bei Hebräern, Syriern, Arabern, Abessiniern und Türken. With 13 original etchings. Insel Verlag, Leipzig, 1925

Binding designs
 Fontane, Theodor, Effi Briest, Berlin, Officina Serpentis, 1926-27; with illustrations by Max Liebermann.

Musical compositions / Songs based on poems
Eduard Mörike: Denk' es o Seele! (Berlin, Birkholz, 1922; written in 1917 in the field hospital at Jarny)
Paul Verlaine: Le ciel est, pardessus le toit... (Berlin, Birkholz, 1925)
Emil Kuh: Hirschlein ging im Wald spazieren (after the children's song, set for voice and piano by Marcus Behmer). For the "19th", 22 July 1943 (privately printed for Konstantin [Greiff-Helmrich] in a very small edition)

Selected exhibitions

Solo exhibitions
2018 - (11 July – 2 September)  Klingspor Museum, Offenbach am Main: "Delphine in Offenbach. Marcus Behmer. Meister der kleinen Formate" ("Delphine in Offenbach. Marcus Behmer. Master of the small formats"), for the 60th anniversary of Behmer's death
2009 (1 October) Galerie im Antiquariat Marcus Haucke, Berlin, for Behmer's 130th birthday
2008 (24 July – 2 September) - Galerie Buchholz, Berlin
2008 - "Täfele" ("Panels"). Antiquariat & Galerie Marcus Haucke, Berlin
2000 - Antiquariat & Galerie Marcus Haucke, Berlin
1979 - Stadtmuseum, Weimar
1979 - Stadtbibliothek, Berlin-Ost
1979 - Klingspor-Museum, Offenbach
1978 - Galerie Werner Kunze, Berlin
1978 - 1979 - Kunstkreis Novo Industrie, Mainz
1958 - Klingspor Museum, Offenbach
1958 - 1959 - Ehemals Staatliche Museen Berlin / Kunstbibliothek, Berlin
1956 - Städelsches Kunstinstitut, Frankfurt am Main
1954 - Kunstamt Charlottenburg, Berlin
1952 - "Arbeiten aus 50 Jahren" ("Works of 50 Years"), Horst Stobbe Bücherstube, München
1951 - Galerie Springer, Berlin
1950 - Galerie Rosen, Berlin
1947 - A. Wollbrück & Co. Buchhandlung und Antiquariat, Berlin
1927 - Kunstbibliothek, Berlin
1912 - "An exhibition of drawings, etchings and ex libris by Marcus Behmer", Berlin Photographic Company, New York
1910 - Exhibition in the studio of Alexander Olbricht, Weimar
1904 - "Marcus Behmer, Zeichnungen, Aquarelle, Holzschnitte" ("Marcus Behmer, drawings, watercolours, woodcuts"), Kunstverein, Jena

Group exhibitions
1997 – "Goodbye to Berlin. 100 Jahre Schwulenbewegung" ("Goodbye to Berlin. 100 Years of the Gay Movement)". Schwules Museum, Berlin
1984 – "Eldorado", Berlin Museum, Berlin
1980 – "Der gekrümmte Horizont - Kunst in Berlin 1945-1967" ("The Crooked Horizon - Art in Berlin 1945-1967", Academy of Arts, Berlin
1929 – "Das deutsche illustrierte Buch von 1880 bis 1929" ("The German Illustrated Book from 1880 to 1929", Horst Stobbe Bücherstube, Munich
1909 – "Winterausstellung der Sezession" ("Winter Exhibition of the Secession")(graphics), Akademie der Künste, Berlin
1905 – "Alexander Olbricht, Marcus Behmer (Zeichnungen, Radierungen, Holzschnitte)" ("Alexander Olbricht, Marcus Behmer: drawings, etchings, wooodcuts"), Kunstverein, Jena
1903 – Secession, Berlin
1902 – "Vienna Secession 13th Exhibition", Vienna
1900 – "Vienna Secession 8th Exhibition", Vienna

Notes

References
 

 Additional sources 
 
Max Deri: "Marcus Behmer – Berlin". In: Deutsche Kunst und Dekoration, Bd. 30, April 1912 – September 1912, pp. 415–423 (online version)
Reichshandbuch der deutschen Gesellschaft – Das Handbuch der Persönlichkeiten in Wort und Bild. Erster Band, Deutscher Wirtschaftsverlag, Berlin 1930, Neuausgabe München o. J., Saur, 
Birnbaum, Martin, Marcus Behmer. New York 1912
 Reprinted 2018, Forgotten Books, 
"Bucheinbände von Marcus Behmer". In: Stammtischblätter der Maximilian-Gesellschaft, Jg. 1927, pp. 53–87
Vollmer, Künstlerlexikon, Vol. I, p. 155f.
Halbey, Hans Adolf, Marcus Behmer als Illustrator./Handeinbände von Frieda Thiersch zu Drucken der Bremer Presse. Neu-Isenburg 1970 (with incomplete bibliography of works illustrated by Behmer)
 Hans Adolf Halbey, Richard von Sichowsky: Marcus Behmer in seinen Briefen als Buchgestalter, Illustrator und Schriftzeichner. Von der Typographie zum West-östlichen Divan, den Radierungen zur Ilsebill, den Holzschnitten zum Petronius und der Hebräischen Schrift. Verlag Hans Christians, Hamburg 1974
Marcus Behmer: Exhibition catalogue and attempt at a catalogue raisonné. With texts by Marcus Behmer, Benno Meyer-Wehlack and others. Edited by Marcus Haucke. Berlin, Galerie im Antiquariat Haucke, 12 September 2000 to 14 February 2001. Octavo, with  c. 95 illustrations, 80 pages. Card covers with illustration of bookbinder's stamp and portrait of MB. 
Peter Christian Hall: Delphine in Offenbach. Marcus Behmer. Meister der kleinen Formate, Klingspor Museum, Offenbach am Main 2018.
Renate Müller Krumbach: "Marcus Behmer, Illustrator, Buchkünstler, Briefschreiber" In: Zeitschrift der Schweizerischen Bibliophilen-Gesellschaft, Bd. 47, 2004, pp. 66–78
Renate Müller-Krumbach: "Marcus Behmer (1879-1958). Ouvre gravé – eigenhändiges Werkverzeichnis". In: Gesellschaft der Bibliophilen (ed.): Imprimatur: ein Jahrbuch für Bücherfreunde. N.F. 19. Harrassowitz, 2005, ISSN 0073-5620, pp. 289–307

External links

List of the contents of Behmer's estate in the Bayerische Staatsbibliothek
 

German illustrators
1879 births
1958 deaths
Writers from Weimar
German graphic designers
German male painters
German gay artists
German LGBT painters
Gay painters
Artists from Weimar
People convicted under Germany's Paragraph 175